D is the first live album released by brazilian rock band Os Paralamas do Sucesso at the Montreux Jazz Festival in Switzerland.

Track listing
All songs written by Herbert Vianna, except where noted:
"Será Que Vai Chover" – 5:28
"Alagados" (Bi Ribeiro, João Barone, Herbert Vianna) – 7:15
"Ska" – 2:55
"Óculos" – 7:05
"O Homem" (Bi Ribeiro, Herbert Vianna) – 4:32
"Selvagem" (Bi Ribeiro, João Barone, Herbert Vianna) – 4:51
"Charles, Anjo 45" (Jorge Ben Jor) – 4:47
"A Novidade" (Bi Ribeiro, João Barone, Gilberto Gil, Herbert Vianna) – 4:08
"Meu Erro" – 4:18
"Será Que Vai Chover?" (studio version) – 5:08

Personnel
Herbert Vianna - vocals, guitar
Bi Ribeiro - bass guitar
João Barone - drums, percussion
João Fera - keyboards
George Israel - saxophone in "Ska"

References

Os Paralamas do Sucesso live albums
1987 live albums
EMI Records live albums